Cha-uat is a district (amphoe) in the southern part of Nakhon Si Thammarat province, southern Thailand.

Geography
Neighboring districts are (from the west clockwise): Thung Song, Chulabhorn, Ron Phibun, Chaloem Phra Kiat, Chian Yai, and Hua Sai of Nakhon Si Thammarat Province; Ranot of Songkhla province; Khuan Khanun and Pa Phayom of Phatthalung province; and Huai Yot of Trang province.

Khao Pu - Khao Ya National Park is in the Nakhon Si Thammarat mountain range at the boundary of Phatthalung and Trang Provinces.

History
The minor district (king amphoe) was created in 1923, when it was split from Ron Phibun district. It was upgraded to a full district on 1 January 1953.

Administration
The district is divided into 11 sub-districts (tambons), which are further subdivided into 88 villages (mubans). Cha-uat is a township (thesaban tambon) which covers parts of tambon Cha-uat and Tha Pra Cha. There are a further 11 tambon administrative organizations (TAO).

References

External links
amphoe.com

Districts of Nakhon Si Thammarat province